The 1996 European Weightlifting Championships were held in Stavanger, Norway for the men. The women competition were held in Prague, Czech Republic. It was the 75th edition of the men event, and the 9th for the women.

Medal overview

Men

Women

European Weightlifting Championships
European Weightlifting Championships, 1996
International weightlifting competitions hosted by Norway
European Weightlifting Championships, 1996